Jack Knell (10 July 1878 – 5 August 1952) was an  Australian rules footballer who played with Geelong in the Victorian Football League (VFL).

Notes

External links 

1878 births
1952 deaths
Australian rules footballers from Victoria (Australia)
Geelong Football Club players